George Hawkins Williams (1818 – March 7, 1889) was an American politician and lawyer. He served in the Maryland House of Delegates in 1878, Maryland Senate from 1880 to 1884, and as President of the Maryland Senate in 1882.

Early life
George Hawkins Williams was born in 1818, in Baltimore, Maryland to Elizabeth Bordley (née Hawkins) and George Williams. He graduated from Harvard Law School in 1839. He studied law under William Schley and was admitted to the bar in Maryland in 1843.

Career
Williams worked as a lawyer. He was a Democrat. In 1878, Williams was elected to the Maryland House of Delegates, representing Baltimore County. Williams served in the Maryland Senate, representing Baltimore County from 1880 to 1884. He was elected as President of the Maryland Senate in 1882.

Personal life
Williams married Eleanor Addison Gittings (1824–1881), daughter of John Sterret Gittings, in 1843. They had nine children:
 Charlotte Carter Ritchie, married Dr. Walter Prescott Smith
 Eleanor Addison, married Dr. Thomas Chatard
 Elizabeth Hawkins, married Dr. Robert Brown Morrison (or Morison)
 Ernault H.
 George May
 John Sterett Gittings
 Rebecca Nichols, married Dr. William Travers Howard
 Sydney B.
 Williams Smith Gittings, married Julia Bell Deford

Williams brother was a historian, Elihu Riley. Williams died on March 7, 1889, at his home in Baltimore.

References

External links
 George Hawkins Williams (1818–1889)

Date of birth missing
1818 births
1889 deaths
People from Baltimore
Harvard Law School alumni
Members of the Maryland House of Delegates
Maryland state senators
Maryland lawyers